Sritej is an Indian actor who works in Telugu-language films. He came into limelight with the 2019 film Lakshmi's NTR directed by Ram Gopal Varma. He was also cast in Nandamuri Balakrishna's NTR: Kathanayakudu and NTR: Mahanayakudu. He played the role of Nara Chandrababu Naidu in Lakshmi's NTR.

Film career 
Shritej started his career in 2013. He played the role of Devineni Nehru in the Film Vangaveeti. He played the role of late Y. S Raja Shekar Reddy, former Chief minister of Andhra Pradesh in NTR: Kathanayakudu and NTR: Mahanayakudu.

In an Interview, he said that NTR, Chiranjeevi and Ravi Teja are his inspiration.

Early career
He started his career as an Assistant Director in 2006 and worked for the films Aadavari Matalaku Arthale Verule (2007) and Mounaragam. Later he worked for the Government documentaries and some temple documentaries till 2013.

Filmography

Television 

|2021
|Parampara
|MohanRao
|Disney+ Hotstar

References

Living people
Male actors from Vijayawada
Telugu male actors
People from Krishna district
Indian male film actors
Male actors in Telugu cinema
21st-century Indian male actors
1983 births